John S. Konesky (born November 19, 1980) is an American guitarist and record producer, best known for his role as the lead electric guitar player for Tenacious D.

Konesky was born and raised in Columbus, Ohio, where he performed in a band with friend John Spiker. Through a mutual friend, he and Spiker met Tenacious D guitarist Kyle Gass, who was recruiting musicians for his Trainwreck project. In 2003, Konesky relocated to Los Angeles to become the electric guitarist for Trainwreck. In 2005, Konesky and Spiker performed on the second Tenacious D album The Pick of Destiny and would then perform live on The Pick of Destiny Tour, making them (alongside drummer Brooks Wackerman) additional live members of Tenacious D. In 2010, Trainwreck split up, which lead him and Gass to form Kyle Gass Band. In 2012, Konesky formed country band Wynchester alongside Kyle Gass Band lead vocalist, Mike Bray, whom released their debut record in 2018.

In 2009, Konesky and Gass worked together on the YouTube channel Guitarings. Konesky was a member of Tenacious D when the band won a Grammy in 2015 for their cover of Dio's "The Last in Line".

Early life
Konesky was born in Columbus, Ohio on November 19, 1980. He graduated from Hilliard Davidson High School in 1999. He has played guitar for almost 30 years, starting at the age of 9.

Discography
Trainwreck — Trainwreck Live (2004)
Tenacious D — The Pick of Destiny (2006)
John Konesky — Kones (2008)
Trainwreck —The Wreckoning (2009)
Tenacious D — Rize of the Fenix (2012)
Kyle Gass Band — Kyle Gass Band (2013)
Big Talk — Straight In No Kissin' (2015)
Tenacious D — Tenacious D Live (2015)
Kyle Gass Band — Thundering Herd (2016)
John Carpenter —Anthology: Movie Themes 1974–1998 (2017) — Guitar on "In the Mouth of Madness"
Wynchester — Wynchester (2018)
Tenacious D — Post-Apocalypto (2018)

References

External links
 
 
 An interview with John Spiker and John Konesky (under the pseudonyms of Boy Johnny and John Bartholomew Shredman respectively) (archived copy)

Living people
American rock guitarists
American male guitarists
Tenacious D members
1980 births
Big Talk members
Trainwreck with Kyle Gass members
Kyle Gass Band members